Midnight Dolls (Spanish: Muñecas de medianoche) is a 1979 Mexican erotic drama film directed by Rafael Portillo and starring Jorge Rivero, Isela Vega and Sasha Montenegro.

Cast
 Jorge Rivero
 Isela Vega 
 Sasha Montenegro 
 Carmen Salinas 
 Rafael Inclán 
 Víctor Manuel Castro 
 Pompín Iglesias 
 Princesa Lea 
 Roberto G. Rivera
 Irina Areu 
 Diana Arriaga 
 Angélica Chain 
 Enrique Cuenca 
 Humberto Elizondo 
 Armando Silvestre

References

Bibliography 
 Charles Ramírez Berg. Cinema of Solitude: A Critical Study of Mexican Film, 1967-1983. University of Texas Press, 2010.

External links 
 

1979 films
1970s erotic drama films
Mexican erotic drama films
1970s Spanish-language films
Films about prostitution in Mexico
Films directed by Rafael Portillo
1979 drama films
1970s Mexican films